С Кем Ты? (Who Are You With?) is the second album by the Russian heavy metal band Aria. It is the last Aria album to feature Alik Granovsky and Andrey Bolshakov, who composed most of the music on it.

Track listing

Personnel
Valery Kipelov - vocals
Vladimir Holstinin - guitar
Andrey Bolshakov - guitar
Alik Granovsky - bass
Igor Molchanov - drums
Kirill Pokrovsky - keyboards
Aleksandr Lvov - sound engineer
Viktor Vekshtein - manager
Georgy Molitvin - photography
Vladislav Provotorov - front cover
Valentin Kudryavtsev - computer design
Vasily Gavrilov - design artist

References

1986 albums
Aria (band) albums